Louis-Roland Comeau, CM (born 7 January 1941) was a Progressive Conservative party member of the House of Commons of Canada. He was a professor by career.

Biography

Education
Comeau graduated with a Bachelor of Education degree from Dalhousie University after obtaining an engineering and science degree from Saint Mary's University.

Political career
He was first elected at the South Western Nova riding in the 1968 general election. After serving in the 28th Canadian Parliament, Comeau left federal office and did not campaign in the 1972 election.

After politics
Since that time he served on various boards, chairing life insurance company Assomption Vie and air traffic control operator Nav Canada. He also chaired the Independent Review Panel on New Brunswick's Workplace Health, Safety and Compensation System from 2007 to 2008.

A library at Université Sainte-Anne bears his name, where he became chancellor in 1994. He also became the seventh chancellor of the University of Moncton in 2004.

Comeau became a Member of the Order of Canada in 2002.

Personal life
Comeau and his wife, Clarice Theriault, have three children.

Electoral record

References

External links
 

1941 births
Living people
Dalhousie University alumni
Members of the House of Commons of Canada from Nova Scotia
Members of the Order of Canada
People from Digby County, Nova Scotia
Progressive Conservative Party of Canada MPs
Saint Mary's University (Halifax) alumni